Elliot Page (formerly Ellen Page; born February 21, 1987) is a Canadian actor. He has received various accolades, including an Academy Award nomination, two BAFTA Awards and Primetime Emmy Award nominations, and a Satellite Award. Page publicly came out as transgender in December 2020. In March 2021, he became the first openly trans man to appear on the cover of Time.

Page came to recognition for his role in the television franchise Pit Pony (1997–2000), for which he was nominated for a Young Artist Award, and for his recurring roles in Trailer Park Boys (2002) and ReGenesis (2004). One of Page's first roles in a mainstream US-distributed film was in the 2003 made-for-television film Going For Broke. Page had his breakthrough starring in the film Hard Candy (2005), for which he won an Austin Film Critics Association Award and received an Empire Award nomination. He received critical acclaim for portraying the title role in Jason Reitman's film Juno (2007), and earned nominations for an Academy Award, two BAFTA Awards, a Critics' Choice Award, a Golden Globe Award and a Screen Actors Guild Award for his performance. At age 20, it made him the fourth-youngest nominee for the Academy Award Best Actress at the time.

Page has earned additional accolades and praise for roles in The Tracey Fragments (2007), Whip It (2009), Super (2010), Inception (2010), and Tallulah (2016). He has also portrayed Kitty Pryde in the X-Men films The Last Stand (2006) and Days of Future Past (2014), produced the film Freeheld (2015) in which he also starred, and made his directorial debut with the documentary There's Something in the Water (2019). He provided voice acting and motion-capture acting for the main character in the video game Beyond: Two Souls (2013), for which he received a BAFTA Games Award nomination. His later television credits include hosting the documentary series Gaycation (2016–2017), for which he was nominated for two Primetime Emmy Awards, and portraying Viktor Hargreeves in the Netflix series The Umbrella Academy (2019–present).

Early life and education 
Page was born on February 21, 1987, in Halifax, Nova Scotia, to Martha Philpotts, a teacher, and Dennis Page, a graphic designer. He was assigned female at birth and used the birth name of Ellen prior to transitioning. Page attended the Halifax Grammar School until grade 10, and spent some time at Queen Elizabeth High School. After graduating from the Shambhala School in 2005, Page spent two years in Toronto, studying in the Interact Program at Vaughan Road Academy, along with close friend and fellow Canadian actor Mark Rendall.

Career

1997–2007: Early roles and widespread recognition 
Page first acted on camera in 1997 at the age of ten, starring as Maggie Maclean in the CBC Television movie Pit Pony, which later spun off into a television series of the same name that ran from 1999 to 2000. For the role, he was nominated for a Young Artist Award. In 2002, Page starred as Joanie in the film Marion Bridge, which is noted for being his first feature-film role. In the same year, he was cast in the television series Trailer Park Boys in the recurring role of Treena Lahey, which he played for five episodes. Page had roles in the films Touch & Go and Love That Boy in 2003, and he also starred in the television films Homeless to Harvard: The Liz Murray Story and Ghost Cat in the same year. For Ghost Cat, he won the Gemini Award for Best Performance in a Children's or Youth Program or Series. In 2004, Page starred in the drama Wilby Wonderful, for which he won an award at the Atlantic Film Festival and was nominated for a Genie Award. Also in 2004, he had a recurring role in season 1 of the series ReGenesis as Lilith Sandström, daughter of the show's protagonist.

In 2005, Page received recognition for his role in the movie Hard Candy, where he portrayed Hayley Stark, a young girl who takes a pedophile hostage. The film was a critical and commercial success, and he received acclaim for his performance, with USA Today praising him for his role, stating that Page "manages to be both cruelly callous and likable" and gives "one of the most complex, disturbing and haunting performances of the year". For the role, he won the Austin Film Critics Association Award for Best Actress in 2006, among other awards and nominations. Also in 2005, he starred in the British film Mouth to Mouth. In 2006, Page appeared in X-Men: The Last Stand (2006) as Kitty Pryde, a girl who can walk through walls. In the previous X-Men movies, the part had been used in brief cameos played by other actors, but never as a main character. The film was a commercial success.

In 2007, he had his widespread breakthrough for his leading role as the title character in the coming-of-age comedy-drama film Juno. A critical and financial success, the film was widely considered to be one of the best of the 2000s, and Page's performance earned him critical acclaim. Film critic A. O. Scott of The New York Times described him as "frighteningly talented" and Roger Ebert said, "Has there been a better performance this year than [Page's] creation of Juno? I do not think so". For his performance, Page was nominated for several awards, including an Academy Award for Best Actress, a BAFTA Award for Best Actress in a Leading Role, a Critics' Choice Award for Best Actress, a Golden Globe Award for Best Actress — Motion Picture Comedy or Musical, and a Screen Actors Guild Award for Outstanding Performance by a Female Actor in a Leading Role. He also won a Canadian Comedy Award, an Independent Spirit Award, and a Satellite Award for the role, as well as numerous critics awards, including Detroit Film Critics Society, Austin Film Critics Association and Florida Film Critics Circle. Also in 2007, he appeared in The Stone Angel, and led the films An American Crime and The Tracey Fragments, the latter of which also earned him critical acclaim, with the Boston Herald writing that "It is also a further reminder that Page is the real thing. But we knew that already". He won the Vancouver Film Critics Circle Award for Best Actress in a Canadian Film, among other accolades.

2008–2014: Rise to prominence and established actor 
In 2008, Page co-starred in the comedy-drama film Smart People, which premiered in January that year at the Sundance Film Festival, and received a mixed response from critics. In the film, he played the overachieving daughter of a college professor. On March 1, 2008, Page hosted Saturday Night Live. On May 3, 2009, he guest starred in "Waverly Hills 9-0-2-1-D'oh", an episode of The Simpsons, as the character Alaska Nebraska, a parody of Hannah Montana. In September 2009, he starred in Drew Barrymore's directorial debut, Whip It, as a member of a roller derby team. The film premiered at the 2009 Toronto International Film Festival and had its wide release on October 2, 2009.

In August 2009, Page was cast in the big-budget Christopher Nolan thriller Inception, which began filming the same year. The film was released on July 16, 2010, and was a commercial success. It received widespread acclaim from critics, being hailed as one of the best films of the 2010s. The cast, including Page, earned several accolades, with Page earning nominations from the Saturn Awards and the MTV Awards. He also starred in the 2010 film Super, which he accepted after seeing the script for the film. The film received mixed reviews, though Page was praised for his performance. In January 2010, Page began appearing in a series of advertisements for Cisco Systems, including commercials set in Lunenburg, Nova Scotia. That April, the Michael Lander film Peacock featured Page as Maggie Bailey, a struggling young mother. Page noted the film as "one of the boldest screenplays I've come across in my albeit short career; it's a character and story I can throw myself into and exactly the type of movie I love to be a part of". In April 2011, it was announced that Page would co-star as Monica in the Woody Allen film To Rome with Love, a film told in four separate vignettes; the film was released in 2012.

In June 2012, Quantic Dream announced the video game Beyond: Two Souls in which Page through voice acting and motion-capture acting portrays one of the protagonists, Jodie Holmes; it was released on October 8, 2013, in North America. The game polarized critics, but Page earned praise for his performance, with GamesTM calling it "truly breathtaking [...] one of the truly great videogame acting showcases". He was given various awards and nominations for the role, including the British Academy Games Award for Best Performer. In 2013, another video game, The Last of Us, was released. Page accused the production for using his likeness without permission; the character's appearance was subsequently redesigned to better reflect the actual performer's personality and make the character younger.

In 2013, Page stated that his directorial debut would be Miss Stevens, and would star Anna Faris and be produced by Gary Gilbert, Jordan Horowitz and Doug Wald; the project eventually moved forward without Page, with scriptwriter Julia Hart replacing Page as the director. Also in 2013, he co-starred in Zal Batmanglij's thriller The East, a film inspired by the experiences and drawing on thrillers from the 1970s, and he also starred in Lynn Shelton's Touchy Feely. In 2014, Page reprised his role as Kitty Pryde in X-Men: Days of Future Past (2014). The film was a major box-office success, and received positive reviews from critics, being noted as one of the best films in the X-Men franchise. Page was praised for his performance and was nominated for the Teen Choice Award for Choice Movie Scene Stealer and the Kids' Choice Award for Female Action Star. In December 2014, Page portrayed Han Solo in a staged reading of Star Wars Episode V: The Empire Strikes Back.

2015–present: Continued success and other ventures 

In 2015, Page starred in and produced the film Freeheld, about Laurel Hester, which was adapted from the 2007 short film of the same name. The film received a mixed response from critics, with review site Rotten Tomatoes writing that "Freeheld certainly means well, but its cardboard characters and by-the-numbers drama undermine its noble intentions". In 2016, Page co-starred in the Netflix film Tallulah as the eponymous character; the film marked his third collaboration with director Sian Heder, and his second collaboration with Allison Janney, both of whom he worked with on Juno. In the film, his character is a young woman who abducts a baby and tries to pass it off as her own. On his acting, The Guardian wrote "...what grounds it are the terrific performances and Heder's rich direction and screenplay". In the same year, he appeared in the film Window Horses and provided the English voice of Rosy in the French film My Life as a Zucchini, the latter of which earned critical acclaim and a nomination for the Academy Award for Best Animated Feature.

On November 9, 2017, it was announced that Page had been cast in the main role of Vanya/Viktor Hargreeves in the Netflix series The Umbrella Academy. The show received positive reviews from critics, and Page was acclaimed for his performance, earning a Saturn Award nomination in 2019. After Page came out as transgender, it was revealed that he would continue his role in the show, with Netflix updating Page's name across the service. In March 2022, it was announced that Page's character would return in the upcoming third season and transition to male; the character briefly comes out to his siblings during "World's Biggest Ball of Twine". Gizmodo reported that the change "was very likely done to reflect Page's own transition".

He headlined the science-fiction film Flatliners, a remake of the 1990 film of the same name which was released in 2017, emerging as a commercial success. Flatliners was panned by critics, although Page and the ensemble cast were praised, with film critic Matt Zoller Seitz writing that "Luna and Page in particular make much stronger impressions than you might expect, given the repetitious and mostly shallow scenarios they're asked to enact ... But the choppy, cliched visuals and the script's superficial approach to the characters' predicaments ultimately undo any goodwill that the actors can generate." Also in 2017, he produced and starred in the film The Cured.

In 2019, Page starred in the Netflix miniseries Tales of the City as Shawna Hopkins, which received positive reviews. Page, along with Ian Daniel, directed and produced the documentary There's Something in the Water, which is about environmental racism; the film premiered at the 2019 Toronto International Film Festival, and was later released on Netflix on March 27, 2020. The film received positive reviews from critics, with The Hollywood Reporter writing that the film, while "made in a standard documentary format that includes a voiceover and a tad too much weepy music", "gets its job done directly enough, underlining a situation that remains dire despite what seems to be a growing level awareness around the country". Page will next have a voice role in the upcoming film Naya Legend of the Golden Dolphin and Robodog.

In August 2021, Page collaborated with Mark Rendall for a music release on Bandcamp. The three-track EP has been described as a "lo-fi bedroom pop adventure" in the press. In August 2021, he signed an overall deal with Universal Content Productions. In September 2021, Page launched a production company, Page Boy Productions, and appointed Matt Jordan Smith to serve as Head of Development and Production. In February 2022, it was announced that Flatiron Books had acquired the publishing rights to Pageboy, a memoir written by Page, for $3 million, with the book set to release in 2023. In June 2022, Page revealed that he was writing a screenplay with his Mouth to Mouth co-star Beatrice Brown.

Personal life 
On abortion rights, in 2008, Page described himself as a pro-choice feminist. He was one of 30 celebrities who participated in a 2008 online advertisement series for US Campaign for Burma, calling for an end to the military dictatorship in Myanmar. Page practices a vegan lifestyle, and PETA named him and Jared Leto the Sexiest Vegetarians of 2014. He is an atheist, having remarked that religion "has always been used for beautiful things, and also as a way to justify discrimination".

On February 14, 2014, Page, who at that time presented as female, came out as gay during a speech at the Human Rights Campaign's "Time to Thrive" conference in Las Vegas. In November 2017, Page stated that he had been outed at age 18 by filmmaker Brett Ratner while on the set of X-Men: The Last Stand. His account was corroborated by co-star Anna Paquin, who said that she was present when Ratner made the comment. In a lengthy Facebook post, Page expressed gratitude towards people who spoke out against abuse, and expressed frustration at the pattern of those who continued to remain silent on such matters. In 2014, Page was included in The Advocates annual "40 Under 40" list.

In January 2018, Page announced that he and dancer/choreographer Emma Portner had married; they met after Page noticed Portner on Instagram. They separated in mid-2020, and Page filed for divorce in January 2021; it was finalized in early 2021.

Gender transition
On December 1, 2020, Page came out as a trans man on his social media accounts, specified his pronouns as he and they, and revealed his new name, Elliot. Page explained that his decision to speak openly about his gender identity was partially prompted by the COVID-19 pandemic, and partially by the anti-transgender rhetoric in politics and the news cycle. GLAAD spokesperson Nick Adams stated that Page "will now be an inspiration to countless trans and non-binary people". Page's then-wife, Emma Portner, expressed support for him coming out that same day on her Instagram account, saying she was "so proud" of Page. Netflix tweeted: "So proud of our superhero! We love you Elliot!" Canadian Prime Minister Justin Trudeau and several celebrities, such as Ellen DeGeneres, Miley Cyrus, James Gunn, and Kumail Nanjiani, expressed support for Page after the announcement. That same day, Netflix announced that it would update Page's credits and metadata across all titles to reflect his name. These changes were completed by December 8.

Page appeared on the cover of the March 29 / April 5, 2021 issue of Time, making him the first openly trans man to do so. He requested that Wynne Neilly photograph him for the cover because he wanted another transgender person to be the photographer. In the featured article, he described himself as queer and non-binary, and revealed that at the time he came out, he had been recovering from undergoing top surgery, a process that he described as "life-saving". Page also revealed that at the age of nine, "I felt like a boy... I wanted to be a boy. I would ask my mom if I could be someday."

Filmography

Film

Television

Video games

Accolades 
For his performance in Juno (2007), Page received several awards and nominations in Best Breakthrough Performance and Best Actress categories, winning three Teen Choice Awards, a Canadian Comedy Award and a Satellite Award, as well as nominations for two British Academy Film Awards (BAFTAs), an Academy Award (Oscar) and a Golden Globe Award. His roles in the drama films The Tracey Fragments (2007) and Freeheld (2015), the sci-fi film Inception (2010), and the superhero works X-Men: Days of Future Past (2014) and The Umbrella Academy (2019–) earned him numerous accolades.

Page hosted the television documentary series Gaycation (2016) alongside Ian Daniel, which earned him two Primetime Emmy Award nominations. He additionally served as a voice and motion capture actor in the video game Beyond: Two Souls in 2013, garnering five award nominations, including a nomination for a British Academy Games Award for Performer in 2014.

See also
 List of actors with Academy Award nominations
 List of Canadian Academy Award winners and nominees
 List of Canadian actors
 List of LGBTQ Academy Award winners and nominees
 List of oldest and youngest Academy Award winners and nominees – Youngest nominees for Best Actress in a Leading Role
 List of transgender film and television directors

Notes

References

Further reading

External links 

 

1987 births
Living people
21st-century Canadian male actors
Male actors from Halifax, Nova Scotia
Canadian atheists
Canadian male child actors
Canadian expatriate male actors in the United States
Canadian feminists
Canadian male film actors
Canadian people of English descent
Canadian male television actors
Canadian male voice actors
Canadian male video game actors
Feminist artists
Best Supporting Actress in a Drama Series Canadian Screen Award winners
Independent Spirit Award for Best Female Lead winners
Transgender male actors
Queer actors
LGBT film producers
LGBT television producers
Canadian LGBT rights activists
Canadian non-binary actors
Transgender non-binary people
Canadian Comedy Award winners
21st-century Canadian LGBT people